In mathematics, a nonelementary antiderivative of a given elementary function is an antiderivative (or indefinite integral) that is, itself, not an elementary function (i.e. a function constructed from a finite number of quotients of constant, algebraic, exponential, trigonometric, and logarithmic functions using field operations).  A theorem by Liouville in 1835 provided the first proof that nonelementary antiderivatives exist. This theorem also provides a basis for the Risch algorithm for determining (with difficulty) which elementary functions have elementary antiderivatives.

Examples

Examples of functions with nonelementary antiderivatives include:

 (elliptic integral)
 (logarithmic integral)
 (error function, Gaussian integral)
 (sine integral, Dirichlet integral)
 (exponential integral)
(in terms of the exponential integral) 
(in terms of the logarithmic integral)

Some common non-elementary antiderivative functions are given names, defining so-called special functions, and formulas involving these new functions can express a larger class of non-elementary antiderivatives. The examples above name the corresponding special functions in parentheses.

Properties

Nonelementary antiderivatives can often be evaluated using Taylor series. Even if a function has no elementary antiderivative, its Taylor series can  be integrated term-by-term like a polynomial, giving the antiderivative function as a Taylor series with the same radius of convergence. However, even if the integrand has a convergent Taylor series, its sequence of coefficients often has no elementary formula and must be evaluated term by term, with the same limitation for the integral Taylor series.

Even if it is not possible to evaluate an indefinite integral (antiderivative) in elementary terms, one can always approximate a corresponding definite integral by numerical integration. There are also cases where there is no elementary antiderivative, but specific definite integrals (often improper integrals over unbounded intervals) can be evaluated in elementary terms: most famously the Gaussian integral 

The closure under integration of the set of the elementary functions is the set of the Liouvillian functions.

See also

References

 Integration of Nonelementary Functions, S.O.S MATHematics.com; accessed 7 Dec 2012.

Further reading

 Williams, Dana P., NONELEMENTARY ANTIDERIVATIVES, 1 Dec 1993. Accessed January 24, 2014.

Integral calculus
Integrals